Kishlak or qishlaq , or qıştaq  qıstaw is a rural settlement of semi-nomadic Turkic peoples of Central Asia and Azerbaijan. The meaning of the term is "wintering place" in Turkic languages (derives from Turkic qış - winter).

The converse term is yaylaq, a summer pasture. 

Traditionally, a clay/mud fence (dewal, duval, from Persian: دیوار divār) surrounds a kishlak.

The term may be seen in the toponyms, such as Afgan-Kishlak (Uzbekistan), Yangi-Kishlak (Turkmenistan), Qışlaq (Azerbaijan) or Qeshlaq in Iran (such as Qeshlaq, Qareh Qeshlaq, and Qeshlaq Khas).

Gallery

See also
Aul

References

Types of village
Turkish words and phrases
Geography of Central Asia
Rural geography